Nadezhda Misyakova  (born 1 June 2000 in Minsk) is a Belarusian singer. She represented Belarus in the Junior Eurovision Song Contest 2014 with her song "Sokal".

Personal life
Nadezhda Misyakova was born on 1 June 2000 in Minsk, Belarus.

Career

Nadezhda Misyakova is engaged in vocals in the Zaranak ensemble (V. I. Mulyavin art center). Since 2011, she took part in the project "I sing" of the ONT TV channel.

In 2013, Misyakova took part in the Belarusian national selection for the Junior Eurovision Song Contest 2013 with the song "Delovaya". She did not win and placed ninth, behind the winner Ilya Volkov and his song "Poy so mnoy". 

In 2013, Nadia performed in the New era Quartet with Roma Svistunov, Elina Mataras and Vlad Luzhinsky. They performed the song "Karmashki" on the TV project "Pop cocktail" In 2015 they posted a song "Ordena". 

In 2014, she returned to the Belarusian Junior Eurovision national selection with the song "Sokal". She finished in a joint first place with two other acts, but after a jury re-count was declared the winner.

In 2015, Nadezhda Misyakova posted a song "Khudozhnik" together with the singer Uzari.

Discography

Singles

Music Videos
Sokal (2014)

References

2000 births
Musicians from Minsk
21st-century Belarusian women singers
Belarusian child singers
Junior Eurovision Song Contest entrants for Belarus
Living people